Berat Castle, also referred to as the Citadel of Berat and castle quarter, is a fortress overlooking the town of Berat, Albania. It dates mainly from the 13th century and contains many Byzantine churches in the area and Ottoman mosques. It is built on a rocky hill on the left bank of the river Osum and is accessible only from the south.

History

After being burned down by the Romans in 200 B.C., the walls were strengthened in the 5th century under Roman Emperor Theodosius II to protect from Barbarian incursions into the Balkans. They were subsequently rebuilt during the 6th century under the Emperor Justinian I and again in the 13th century under the Despot of Epirus, Michael I Komnenos Doukas, cousin of the Byzantine Emperor. This last phase can be seen as a Monogram formed by red bricks set in a wall of the castle. The castle was under the rule of John Komnenos Asen in the mid-14th century The main entrance, on the north side, is defended by a fortified courtyard and there are three smaller entrances.

The fortress of Berat in its present state, even though considerably damaged, remains a magnificent sight. The surface that it encompasses made it possible to house a considerable portion of the cities inhabitants. The buildings inside the fortress were built during the 13th century and because of their characteristic architecture are preserved as cultural monuments. The population of the fortress was Christian, and it had about 20 churches (most built during the 13th century) and only one mosque, for the use of the Turkish garrison (of which there survives only a few ruins and the base of the minaret). The churches of the fortress were damaged through years and only some have remained.

Berat Castle is depicted on the reverse of the Albanian 10 lekë coin, issued in 1996, 2000 and 2013.

See also
List of castles

References

Photo, history and info of Berat Castle

Buildings of Justinian I
Castles in Albania
Tourist attractions in Berat
Buildings and structures in Berat
Roman fortifications in Macedonia